Sumi Jo, OSI (born 22 November 1962) is a South Korean lyric coloratura soprano known for her Grammy award-winning interpretations of the bel canto repertoire.

Life and career

Early life and education 
Jo was born Jo Su-gyeong  in Changwon, South Korea. Her mother was an amateur singer and pianist who had been unable to pursue her own professional music studies because of politics in Korea during the 1950s. Determined to provide her daughter with opportunities she never had, Jo's mother enrolled her in piano lessons at the age of 4 and later voice lessons at the age of 6. Although Jo's family lived in a rented property, her parents bought a piano for her to play. Her mother raised and trained Jo strictly. Jo recalled even when her mother went out, she locked the door outside so that Jo could not play truant. As a child, Jo would often spend up to eight hours a day studying music.

In 1976, Jo entered the Sun Hwa Arts School from which she graduated in 1980, receiving dual diplomas in voice and piano. She entered the department of vocal music at the Seoul National University (SNU) with the best practical score since the department had opened. There she continued her music studies from 1981 to 1983. While studying at SNU, Jo made her professional recital debut, appeared in several concerts with the Korean Broadcasting System, and made her professional operatic debut as Susanna in The Marriage of Figaro with Seoul Opera.

In 1983, Jo left SNU in order to study at the Conservatorio Santa Cecilia in Rome. Among her teachers were Carlo Bergonzi and Giannella Borelli. While Jo studied in Italy, she was frequently heard in concert in Italian cities and on national radio broadcasts and telecasts. It was during this time when Jo began to use "Sumi" as her stage name in order to make her name more friendly to European language speakers who often found it difficult to pronounce Su-gyeong. She graduated in 1985 with majors in keyboard and voice.

Following graduation, Jo began to study with Elisabeth Schwarzkopf and won several international competitions in Seoul, Naples, Enna, Barcelona, and Pretoria. In August 1986, she was unanimously awarded first prize in the Carlo Alberto Cappelli International Competition in Verona, one of the world's most important contests, open only to first-prize winners of other major competitions.

Career 
In 1986, Jo made her European operatic debut as Gilda in Verdi's Rigoletto at the Teatro Comunale Giuseppe Verdi in Trieste. This performance drew the attention of Herbert von Karajan, who proceeded to cast her as Oscar in Un ballo in maschera opposite Plácido Domingo for the 1989 Salzburg Festival. Karajan's death during festival rehearsals prevented Jo from actually singing on stage under his baton (Georg Solti conducted the performances) but she did sing under Karajan in the studio recording of Ballo, made in the early months of 1989 for Deutsche Grammophon.

In 1988, Jo made her La Scala debut as Thetis in Jommelli's Fetonte. That same year she made her debut with the Bavarian State Opera and sang Barbarina in The Marriage of Figaro at the Salzburg Festival.

In 1989, Jo made her debut with the Vienna State Opera and returned to the Salzburg Festival to sing Oscar in Verdi's Un ballo in maschera. That same year, she made her debut with the Metropolitan Opera, once again portraying Gilda in Rigoletto. Jo would later reprise this role numerous times with the Met over the next fifteen years.

In 1990, Jo made her debut with the Chicago Lyric Opera as the Queen of the Night in Mozart's The Magic Flute. The following year, she returned to the Metropolitan Opera for another performance as Oscar in Un ballo in maschera and made her Royal Opera, Covent Garden, debut as Olympia in The Tales of Hoffmann. She returned to Covent Garden the next year to sing Adina in L'elisir d'amore and Elvira in I puritani.

In 1993, Jo appeared in the title role of Donizetti's Lucia di Lammermoor with the Metropolitan Opera and sang the role of the Queen of the Night at the Salzburg Festival and Covent Garden. The following year she made her debut with Los Angeles Opera as Sophie in Strauss' Der Rosenkavalier. In 1995 she sang the role of Countess Adèle in Le comte Ory at the Aix-en-Provence Festival.

Over the next decade Jo maintained a busy schedule, singing Lucia in Strasbourg, Barcelona, Berlin, and Paris; La sonnambula in Brussels and Santiago, Chile; I Capuleti e i Montecchi with Minnesota Opera; Olympia and Rosina in New York; the Queen of the Night in Los Angeles; Gilda in Bilbao, Oviedo, Bologna, Trieste, and Detroit among others; Il turco in Italia in Spain; L'enfant et les sortilèges in Boston and Pittsburgh; Le comte Ory in Rome; and Dinorah in New York. She also appeared in performances at the Théâtre du Châtelet, Théâtre des Champs-Élysées, Opéra National de Paris, Washington Opera, the Deutsche Oper Berlin, Opera Australia, and the Teatro Colón.

In addition, she appeared with numerous symphony orchestras in concert, including the Vancouver Symphony Orchestra, the Cincinnati Pops, the Orchestra of St. Luke's, the Vienna Philharmonic, the London Philharmonic Orchestra, the Los Angeles Philharmonic, and the Hollywood Bowl Orchestra among others. Her work led her to sing under such conductors as Sir Georg Solti, Zubin Mehta, Lorin Maazel, James Levine, Kent Nagano, and Richard Bonynge. She also gave recitals throughout Europe, the United States, Canada, and Australia.

In 2002, Jo sang the theme song for the Korean Broadcasting System's broadcast of the 2002 FIFA World Cup, "The Champions".

In 2007, Jo performed her first Violetta in La traviata with the Toulon Opera and in the 2008/2009 season she was scheduled to perform the role of Zerline in Fra Diavolo at the Opera Comique and Opéra Royal de Wallonie.

In 2008, Jo participated in the Beijing Olympics with Renée Fleming and Angela Gheorghiu.

In 2011 Jo provided the singing voice of Veda Pierce in the HBO miniseries Mildred Pierce.

On 9 March 2018, Jo performed a specially-recorded duet with fellow vocalist Sohyang, the song "Here As One", during the opening ceremony of the 2018 Winter Paralympic Games in Pyeongchang, South Korea.

In 2021, Jo was appointed as the visiting distinguished professor at KAIST's Graduate School of Culture Technology.

Academy Award nomination and exclusion 
"Simple Song Number 3", written by David Lang, performed by Jo, and featured in Paolo Sorrentino's 2015 film Youth, was nominated for an Academy Award in 2016 in the Best Song category.  Fellow nominees were  "Manta Ray", performed by Anohni; "Til It Happens to You", performed by Lady Gaga; "Earned It", performed by The Weeknd; and "Writing's on the Wall", performed by Sam Smith (who won the category's award). Although Jo was invited to the ceremony and attended, she was not invited to perform the song. Anohni, a transgender singer, was similarly excluded and subsequently boycotted the ceremony. The other nominees performed their songs during the ceremony.

On the red carpet prior to the ceremonies, Jo and Lang voiced their disappointment with the producers' decision to exclude the song, indirectly referencing the controversy related to that year's Academy Awards and its lack of racial diversity.

Personal life 
Jo is the cousin aunt of South Korean actor Yoo Gun, his father's cousin sister.

Just before she performed Ave Maria at Chatelet, Paris, in 2006, Jo's father, Eonho Jo, died. When she learned that her father had died, she wanted to cancel the performance and return to South Korea for the funeral. Her mother reminded Jo of her promise to her audiences, and said that it was better if she went on with the show in honor of her father. Her performance was dedicated to her father and released as a DVD titled Sumi Jo in Paris – For my Father.

Jo is an advocate for animal rights and one of only five Asian celebrities to make People for the Ethical Treatment of Animals Asia-Pacific's (PETA) first-ever Best-Dressed 2008 list.

Jo's mother, Malsoon Kim died in 2021 after suffering from Alzheimer's for 10 years in hospital. She was unable to attend to her mother's funeral in South Korea due to COVID-19 quarantine, while she was in Italy.

Legacy 
Aria of Zerbinetta in Ariadne auf Naxos, written by Richard Strauss in 1912, is a difficult piece over 20 minutes in length with numerous high notes. Therefore, Strauss modified part of the sheet music because he thought it was impossible to sing. In 1994, however, Jo became the world's first artist to record the unedited original version of the song.  She recorded the song with a Japanese-American conductor, Kent Nagano, in Lyon, France. Jo said it was the hardest record to sing ever. In 1993, she became the first Asian soprano to win La Siola d'Oro. In addition, Jo won six international competitions for the first time as an Asian soprano, and was recorded as the first Asian prima donna who starred in the world's opera theaters.

"Her voice is the best gift God has given," said Herbert von Karajan, who is considered as one of the greatest conductors of the 20th century, and praised her as "a voice from above". Karajan also admired, "I am surprised that you have learned in Korea, are there such excellent teachers in Korea? Korea is a great nation". The New York Metropolitan Theater Opera News praised "her song has already risen above the criticism". Le Monde of France praised her vocals by saying that "Even fairies listen to her songs".

Recordings
Jo has over 50 recordings to her credit, including ten solo albums for Erato Records, the French division of Warner Classics. These recordings include complete operas, oratorio, operetta, orchestral works and Broadway standards. Notable recordings include the voice of the falcon in Sir Georg Solti's Grammy Award winning recording of Strauss's Die Frau ohne Schatten for the Decca label and the role of Oscar the page in Herbert von Karajan's recording of Verdi's Un ballo in maschera for Deutsche Grammophon.

Recitals
Decca
 Carnaval! French Coloratura Arias, Decca (November 15, 1994)
 Compilation – Best of Sumi Jo, Decca (February 4, 2009)
 Compilation – Art of Sumi Jo, Decca (August 11, 1998)

Erato – Warner Classics
 Bel Canto, Arias from Semiramide, La sonnambula, Falstaff, I puritani, I Capuleti e i Montecchi, Linda di Chamounix, Tancredi, Crispino e la comare, La traviata. English Chamber Orchestra, Giuliano Carella. Erato (16 September 1997)
 Sumi Jo Sings Mozart (or Dear Amadeus), Erato (1 October 1996)
 Live at Carnegie Hall, Orchestra of St. Luke's, Richard Bonynge, Erato
 Baroque Journey – arias by Vivaldi, Purcell, Handel, Concertgebouw Chamber Orchestra. Erato (November 13, 2007)
 Virtuoso Arias: from Il Barbiere di Siviglia, La sonnambula, Lakmé, Rigoletto, Dinorah, Lucia di Lammermoor, Ariadne auf Naxos, Candide, Korean song "Boribat" (barley field 보리밭). Monte Carlo Orchestra, . Erato (7 February 1995)
 The Christmas Album, Alessandro Scarlatti: Cantata pastorale per la nascita di Nostro Signore. Christoph Bernhard: Fürchtet euch nicht! Mozart Exsultate, jubilate K165. Cappella Coloniensis of the WDR on historical instruments. Erato (18 September 2001)
 Prayers, Erato (March 20, 2001)
 Only Love, musicals Miss Saigon etc. Erato (11 April 2000)
 Johann Strauss Echoes from Vienna Erato (9 November 1999)
 Les Bijoux – French Arias, Roméo et Juliette "Je veux vivre", Faust (L'air des Bijoux) "Ah! Je ris de me voir si belle en ce miroir!", Mignon "Oui, pour ce soir, je suis reine des fées", L'étoile du nord "C'est bien l'air que chaque matin", Hamlet "À vos jeux, mes amis", Louise "Depuis le jour", Mireille "O légère hirondelle", Les Huguenots "O beau pays de la Touraine", Manon "Obéissons quand leur voix appelle", Les pêcheurs de perles "Me voilà seule", Robinson Crusoé "Conduisez-moi vers celui", ECO, Giuliano Carella, Erato (August 3, 1999)
 La Promessa – Italian Songs, Erato (15 September 1998)
 Sumi Jo The Erato Recitals (10 CDs) Erato (31 January 2012)
 The Sumi Jo Collection Warner Bros UK (18 January 2010)
 Sumi Jo 101: Favorite Crossover and Classics (6CDs) Warner Music Korea (2007)
 With Love: Best 20 Songs of Sumi Jo (2 CDs) Warner Music Korea (2006)
 My Story (2 CDs) Erato/Warner Music Korea (2002) including a vocal version of "Love is just a Dream," from non-vocal version was in MBC drama "Hotelier" O.S.T. (2001).

Universal Korea – Deutsche Grammophon Korea
 Missing You – songs of the world – Universal Korea DG (10 August 2010)
 Ich liebe Dich – German lieder – Universal Korea DG (17 August 2010)
 Libera – Universal Korea, DG (2011)
 single "Hijo de la Luna" (sung in Spanish but entitled "Son of the moon", 달의 아들) (2011, Universal Korea)
 Sumi Jo with Tomomi Nishimoto in concert CD and DVD
 La Luce – Sumi Jo sings Igor Krutoy with Dmitri Hvorostovsky and Lara Fabian – Universal Korea (2012)
 Only Bach – Cantatas for Soprano, Violin & Guitar – Universal Korea DG (2014)

Korean local labels
 Ari Arirang – Italian arias and Korean songs – London Philharmonic, Stephan von Cron (1995, worldwide release 1998, Samsung Music)
 Saeya Saeya (새야 새야) Italian arias and Korean songs. The Korean Symphony, Nanse Gum (1994, Samsung Music)
 Compilation Jo Sumi – Her first purely Korean folk album – Hyangsu (조수미 – 그녀의 첫번째 순수 한국가곡집 – 향수) 20 Korean tracks only, from two previous Korean albums. [鄕愁] (2002, E&E Media)

Opera recordings
 Verdi: Un ballo in maschera with Plácido Domingo, Jean-Luc Chaignaud, Josephine Barstow, Florence Quivar. Vienna Philharmonic, Vienna State Opera Chorus. Herbert von Karajan. DGG 1989.
 Adolphe Adam: Le toréador, Richard Bonynge, Decca (17 March 1998)
 Daniel Auber: Le domino noir. Richard Bonynge (2 CDs) Decca (9 April 1996)
 Königin der Nacht in Die Zauberflöte, Georg Solti. Decca (1990)
 Königin der Nacht in Die Zauberflöte, with Franz-Joseph Selig, Gösta Winbergh, and Luba Orgonasova. Armin Jordan Erato (1989)
 Königin der Nacht in Die Zauberflöte, with Kurt Streit, Barbara Bonney Drottningholm Court Theatre Orchestra, Arnold Östman. L'Oiseau Lyre (1992)
 Zerbinetta in R. Strauss: Ariadne auf Naxos (original 1912 version), Kent Nagano. Virgin Classics (1997) This was the first recording of 1912 original version of R. Strauss and required Sumi JO hit the F6 note in Zerbinetta's aria.
 Giulietta in Offenbach: Les Contes d'Hoffmann with Roberto Alagna, Natalie Dessay, and José van Dam. Kent Nagano. Erato
 Rossini: Le comte Ory with Diana Montague, Gilles Cachemaille, Gino Quilico, Nicolas Rivenq, John Aler. Orchestre et Choeur de l'Opéra de Lyon John Eliot Gardiner, Philips.
 Rossini: Il turco in Italia with Simone Alaimo, Sir Neville Marriner, Philips.
 Rossini: Tancredi with Ewa Podleś. Alberto Zedda. Naxos
 Bellini: Norma with Cecilia Bartoli. Giovanni Antonini. Decca

Guest performances and film music
 Kenny G "Rhythm & Romance" Featuring with Sumi Jo – Mirame Bailar
 MBC epic drama "Ju-mong" O.S.T. (2006) Sumi Jo – A Memory of Love
 KBS drama "The Lost Empire" O.S.T. (2 CDs) Doremi, Korea (2001.12.03) Sumi Jo – If I Leave
 MBC drama "Hu-jun" O.S.T. (1999) Sumi Jo – Elegy of Separation (Bulinbeolgok)
 Wojciech Kilar, vocalise for the soundtrack of the 1999 film The Ninth Gate.
 Cover version of the title song of Andrew Lloyd Webber's 2010 musical Love Never Dies.
 Several of Sumi Jo's recordings were used as the character Veda's singing voice in the 2011 HBO miniseries version of Mildred Pierce. She recorded new tracks specifically for the film, including the "Bridal Chorus" from Wagner's Lohengrin and the popular standard "I'm Always Chasing Rainbows."
She performed "Simple Song Number 3" by David Lang at the end of the film Youth (2015)

DVD
 DVD Sumi Jo in Paris – For My Father (2006)

Filmography

Cinema

Web shows

Awards and honors
 2022 –  Korea Image Award Foundation Stone Award 
 2019 - Sumi Jo received the Order of the Italian Star and granted the Cavaliere title by the Italian government
 2008 – Sumi Jo received the international Puccini Award
 2008 – Sumi Jo sang at the International Olympic Games in Beijing
 2006 Winner of the Proud Korean Award for Culture and Art
 2005 7th Winner of KwanAk Award by Alumni Association of Seoul National University
 2003 – Sumi Jo was elected as an "Artist for Peace" of UNESCO
 2002 – Sumi Jo sang at the World Cup in Seoul, Korea
 2002 18th Woman of the Year by Korea Women Committee
 1997 Best Vocal Album by French Cultural Critics
 1997 Winner of 5th KBS Overseas Korean Award
 1996 Winner of 1st Korean-Chinese Youth Academic Award
 1996 The Best Selling Album of the Year award by British Classic
 1995 Decorated with the Order of Culture Merit, South Korea
 1995 Grand prize winner of Women Dong-a by Dong-a Daily News, Seoul, South Korea
 1994 Winner of Best Soprano, Chile
 1994 Winner of Kim SuGeun Award for Performing Art, Seoul, South Korea
 1993 Winner of La Siola d'Oro, Forli, Italy
 1993 Winner of Grammy Award for Best Opera Recording (conducted by Sir Georg Solti, Deca label)
 1992 Winner of Hong Nanpa Memorial Award
 August 1986 First prize in the Carlo Alberto Cappelli International Competition at Verona
 October 1986 Graduated with honors from the Santa Cecilia Conservatory
 1986 Winner of Pretoria International Music Competitions, South Africa
 1985 Winner of 'Francisco Viñas' International Singing Competition,Barcelona, Spain for Best Female Voice, Best Male Voice went to Samuel Cook. 
 1985 Winner of Viotti International Music Competition (Concorso Internazionale di Musica Viotti), Italy
 1985 Winner of Sicily Enna International Musical Competition, Italy
 1985 Winner of Napoli Zonta International Competition, Italy
 1985 Winner of Viotti International Music Competition, Trieste, Italy (Concorso Internazionale di Musica Viotti)

References

External links 

 
 
 
 , from Adolphe Adam's Le toréador, Nobel Peace Prize Concert 2000
 Streamopera.com/Sumi Jo

1962 births
Living people
Grammy Award winners
People from Seoul
Seoul National University alumni
Conservatorio Santa Cecilia alumni
20th-century South Korean women singers
South Korean operatic sopranos
South Korean Roman Catholics
21st-century South Korean women singers
20th-century women opera singers
21st-century women opera singers
Erato Records artists
Academic staff of KAIST